Ledi Pandita U Maung Gyi (21 April  1939—12 December 1878) was a Burmese writer, translator, and greatest disciple of Ledi Sayadaw. He was the first publisher of the Myanmar Alin magazine.

Early life and education
Ledi Pandita U Maung Gyi is a native of Nyaung Phyu Pin Village, Monywa Township, about seven miles south of Monywa in Upper Burma (Myanmar). He was born on 12 December 1878.

References

1878 births
1939 deaths
Burmese writers
People from Sagaing Region